Zone Warrior is a three-dimensional space combat simulator game written by Julian James for Mac OS and published by Casady & Greene in 1997. It was originally released as ZOA (for Zone of Avoidance). In Zone Warrior, the player is the lone defender of a remote space station under attack by aliens.

The game was followed by a sequel, then Julian James ported the original to iOS.

Gameplay

Reception

Mac OS

The Macintosh Bible Guide to Games commented on the "remarkable" level of detail of the graphics.

iOS
IGN praised the graphics and controls, comparing it the 1979 arcade game Asteroids, finding the early levels easy but the later very challenging. 
Touch Arcade called it "an enjoyable shooter", comparing it to Star Raiders and again Asteroids. Pocket Gamer awarded the game its silver award rating, despite finding the controls challenging.

Legacy
A sequel, Zone Warrior II, was released for OS X in 2001.

References

External links 
 Zone Warrior at gamedb.com

1997 video games
Classic Mac OS games
IOS games
Space combat simulators
Video games developed in the United States